Nikolai Nerling is a German right-wing extremist, anti-Semite and Holocaust denier.

Since 2017, he has been spreading right-wing extremist ideology as a video blogger under the name "Der Volkslehrer". Nerling connects to the ideas of the Reichcitizens, and since 2020 also conspiracy theories of the so-called "Querdenker" movement ("lateral thinker" ). After he downplayed the Holocaust publicly at Dachau concentration camp memorial, he was fined in December 2019 for hate speech. Nikolai Nerling is considered a networker within the neo-Nazi and Holocaust denial scene.

Life 
Nerling he worked as a teacher at a primary school in Berlin. Nerling was dismissed from the state of Berlin in 2018 because of his right-wing extremist internet videos. Nerling shoots a video, among other things, on Querdenker-demonstrations and events. He interviews participants or other alternative media makers like Heiko Schrang.

Notes

1980 births
Living people
Media of Neue Rechte
German nationalists